Adrian Dingle may refer to:

Adrian Dingle (artist) (1911–1974), creator of Nelvana of the Northern Lights
Adrian Dingle (American football) (1977–2022), American football player
Adrian Dingle (writer) (born 1967), author of The Periodic Table: Elements With Style